Minuscule 543 (in the Gregory-Aland numbering of New Testament manuscripts), ε 257 (in von Soden's numbering of New Testament manuscripts) and labelled 556 by biblical scholar and textual critic F. H. A. Scrivener, is a Greek minuscule manuscript of the New Testament, written on parchment. Using the study of comparative handwriting styles (palaeography) it has been assigned to the 12th century.

The manuscript contains the text of the four Gospels, with some gaps and some unusual grammar forms and numerous errors. The manuscript is housed at the University of Michigan.

Description

Contents 
The manuscript is a codex (precursor to the modern book), containing the text of the four Gospels on 184 thick parchment leaves (size ), with several gaps (Matthew 12:11-13:10; Mark 8:4-28; Luke 15:20-16:9; John 2:22-4:6; 4:52-5:43; 11:21-47). One leaf was misplaced during its binding. The parchment is coarse and yellowed by age.

The text of the codex was written two columns per page, 27-30 lines per page, 17 letters per line, in a minute hand using brown ink. The same scribe copied all four Gospels. Breathings (utilised to designate vowel emphasis) and accents (used to indicate voiced pitch changes) are employed in regular form, but in some sort of system. Iota subscript (a small Greek letter ι (iota) written underneath vowels in certain words to indicate a change of sound) is not used, though iota adscriptum (where the ι is written as part of the main text with the same function as the iota subscript) occurs very often, especially in the Gospel of Mark.

The titles to the Gospels of Matthew and Mark run:  (The Gospel of that according to Matthew (Mark)). The titles to Luke and John are the usual:  (The Gospel according to Luke (John)).

There is a division according to the Ammonian Sections, with references to the Eusebian Canons (an early system of dividing the four Gospels into different sections). It contains lectionary markings (to indicate what verse was to be read on a specific day in the churches yearly calendar), Synaxarion (a list of saint's days), Menologion (a list of readings to be read each calendar month), subscriptions, lists of how many phrases (known as  / rhemata) are used in each gospel, and how many lines (known as  / stichoi) are written in each gospel. 
It has additional non-biblical material: The Limits of the Five Patriarchates (as in codices 69 and 211), of which one page is lost.

Nomina sacra and OT quotations 
The nomina sacra are contracted in the usual way, but there are a number of words which the scribe failed to abbreviate. In some of the cases where nomina sacra are uncontracted, they have the heavy bar signifying contraction. υιος (son) is contracted only once (John 4:47). On the other hand, it gives the unusual abbreviations for the other nomina sacra.

Quotations from the Old Testament are indicated in the left margin by a rubricated letter or sign.

Errors 
Almost all the necessary corrections of misspellings have been made. Sometimes a stroke of the pen indicates an error, perhaps to be corrected later. Some corrections seem to be written by prima manu (e.g. Matthew 4:10; 5:19) others plainly secondary manu (Matthew 6; Luke 3; 10:35). The apostrophe is used even when not required, especially in εξ', and ουκ'.

According tο Scrivener, movable nu occurs 416 times especially with words , . In Matthew 12:7; Luke 8:10; John 5:46; 7:7; 8:27 there is a hiatus for lack of it. The error of iotacism occurs 358 times: ει for ι (16 occurrences), ι for ει (35), ο for ω (40), ω for ο (33), αι for ε (13), ε for αι (31), ει for η (23), η for ει (19), η for ι (11), ι for η (7), ε for η (11), η for ε (2), οι for ι (3), ω for ου (20), η for υ (3), υ for η (5), υ for οι (1), υ for ει (1), η for οι (1), οι for η (1), ι for υ (1), οι for ει (2).

There are many errors by homoeoteleuton (Mark 2:18; 4:24; 12:26; 14:70; 15:14; Luke 12:22.47; 13:28.29; John 4:14).

There are some unusual forms like: .

Text 

The Greek text of the codex has been considered a representative of the Caesarean text-type. It belongs to the textual family ƒ13, known also as the Ferrar Group/Family. The handwriting and the menology show the manuscript is a close member of the group. According to biblical scholars and textual critics Kurt and Barbara Aland, it agrees with the Byzantine standard text 151 times, and 72 times with the Byzantine when it has the same reading as the original text. It agrees 31 times with the original text against the Byzantine. It has 57 independent or distinctive readings. It is currently placed in Category III.
According to the Claremont Profile Method, it represents the textual ƒ in Luke 1, Luke 10, and Luke 20, as a core member.

The Pericope Adulterae follows Luke 21:38, as in other manuscripts of the Ferrar Family.

 Textual Variants (short list)
The words after the square bracket are the readings of the codex (before the square bracket are readings of the Textus Receptus).
 Matthew 1:18 and 1:23 — εν γαστρι (pregnant, literally in womb) ] εγγαστρι (inwomb)
 Matthew 5:48 — εν τοις ουρανοις (in the heavens) ]  (heavens)
 Matthew 6:24 — μαμμωνα (mammona) ] μαμωνα (mamona)
 Matthew 7:2 — απο (from) ] εκ (from)
 Matthew 8:4 — Μωσης (Moses) ] Μωυσης (Moses)
 Matthew 8:8 — δεινως (terrible) ] δεινος (terrible)
 Matthew 8:8 — ικανος (sufficient) ] αξιος (worthy)
 Matthew 8:26 — τοις ανεμοις (winds) ] τω ανεμω (wind)
 Matthew 9:17 — απολουνται (ruined) ] απολλουνται (ΝΑ27 has απολλυνται)
 Matthew 9:17 — αμφοτερα ] αμφοτεροι (both)
 Matthew 11:5 — και νεκροι εγειρονται και πτωχοι ευαγγελιζονται (and the dead are raised up and the poor have the gospel preached to them) ] και πτωχοι ευαγγελιζονται και νεκροι εγειρονται (and the poor have the gospel preached to them and the dead are raised up)
 Matthew 26:39 — (text of Luke 22:43-44 appears here) ] ωφθη δε αυτω αγγελος απο του  ενισχυσον αυτον και γενομενος εν αγωνια εκτενεστερον προσηυχετο εγενετο δε ο ιδρος αυτου ωσει θρομβη αθματος καταβαινοντες επι την γην (An angel from heaven appeared to him, empowering him. And being in agony he prayed more earnestly; and his sweat became like great drops of blood falling down to the ground.)
 Mark 1:9 — Ναζαρετ (Nazaret) ] Ναζαρεθ (Nazareth)
 Mark 1:10 — ἀπὸ (from) ] ἐκ (from)
 Mark 1:10 — ἐκ (from) ] εἰς (to)
 Mark 2:4 — κραββατον ] κραβαττον (bed)

History 

Concerning the history of the manuscript, nothing is known until the year 1864, when it was in the possession of a dealer at Janina in Epeiros. It was then purchased from him by a representative of Baroness Burdett-Coutts (1814–1906), a philanthropist, together with other Greek manuscripts (among them codices 532-546). They were transported to England in 1870–1871.

The manuscript was presented by Burdett-Coutts to Sir Roger Cholmely's School, and was housed at the Highgate (Burdett-Coutts III. 5), in London. In 1922 it was acquired for the University of Michigan  It is currently housed at the University of Michigan (Ms. 15) in Ann Arbor.

J. Rendel Harris pointed out that the menology of the Ferrar group contains saints which appear to be peculiar to Calabria or Sicily. Abbe Martin had previously stated that certain palaeographical traits to be observed in these manuscripts were characteristic of Calabrian scriptoria.

Scrivener observed a close textual affinity to the Ferrar group and announced in 1883 in the third edition of "Plain Introduction" as pertaining to the same class. Scrivener collated its text and it was edited posthumously in 1893. This collation was not wholly accurate and Jacob Geerlings, from the University of Utah, gave a new and more accurate collation in 1932.

Gallery

See also 

 List of New Testament minuscules
 Biblical manuscript
 Textual criticism

Notes

References

Further reading 

 J. Rendel Harris, Further researches into the history of the Ferrar-group (London, 1900)
 Kenneth W. Clark, A Descriptive Catalogue of Greek New Testament Manuscripts in America (Chicago, 1937), pp. 280–282.
For more bibliography see: Family 13

External links 
 Images of minuscule 543 at the CSNTM
 R. Waltz, Minuscule 543 at the Encyclopedia of Textual Criticism (2007)

Greek New Testament minuscules
12th-century biblical manuscripts
Family 13